ECDP or eCDP may refer to:
eCrew Development Program, 2010 video game developed by McDonalds
Entesa Catalana de Progrés, political coalition in 
European Cash Duty Paid, Aluminium Premium